The Leith Burghs by-election was a Parliamentary by-election held on 20 February 1914. The constituency returned one Member of Parliament (MP) to the House of Commons of the United Kingdom, elected by the first past the post voting system.

Vacancy
Munro Ferguson had been the Liberal MP for Leith Burghs since 1886 when he succeeded William Gladstone. In February 1914, he was appointed to the post of Governor-General of Australia and thus resigned his seat.

Electoral history
This was the result at the last election;

The result of the previous election is worth noting because it was a three-way contest;

Candidates

Malcolm Smith was chosen as the Liberal candidate to defend the seat. A local businessman, he became the Provost of Leith in 1908.
George Welsh Currie was chosen as the Unionist candidate. He had been born and raised in Edinburgh.
William Walker the previous Labour candidate had taken a job as a Civil Servant which precluded him from standing for parliament. Joseph Nicholas Bell was chosen by the Labour Party as their candidate. He was sponsored by the National Amalgamated Union of Labour.

Campaign
Labour's intervention was expected to hurt the Liberals, but there was evidence that they might still win a three-way contest; Although Labour had not stood here last time, a Labour candidate had contested the January 1910 general election, finishing third and polling 18.9%.

Although Bell was a moderate in Labour Party terms, his campaign was run by extreme Socialists. Bell explained his position by stating he was a Socialist and he was selected by the working class bodies of Leith. The Seamans Union Leader Havelock Wilson visited the constituency to speak in support of the Liberal candidate and was involved in an exchange with the Socialist Emmanuel Shinwell who sought court action for alleged slander with £1,000 for damages.

Result

The change in vote share and swing are compared to the previous three-way contest in January 1910.

Aftermath
A General Election was due to take place by the end of 1915. By the summer of 1914, the following candidates had been adopted to contest that election. Due to the outbreak of war, the election never took place.

The Leith Burghs seat was abolished and mainly replaced for the 1918 elections by Leith. 
Smith did not contest the 1918 elections but was elected MP for Orkney & Shetland in 1921.
Bell became Labour's prospective candidate for the new seat of Leith but was replaced at the eleventh hour.

Currie was the endorsed candidate of the Coalition Government.

References

 Craig, F. W. S. (1974). British parliamentary election results 1885-1918 (1 ed.). London: Macmillan.
 Wikipedia: en.wikipedia.org
 Who's Who: www.ukwhoswho.com
 Debrett's House of Commons 1916

Leith, 1941
History of Leith
Leith Burghs by-election
1910s elections in Scotland
Leith Burghs by-election
1910s in Edinburgh
Leith Burghs by-election